This is a list of lakes of Belgium.

Lakes

See also 

 List of rivers of Belgium

References 

Belgium
Lakes